The Episcopal Diocese of Northern Michigan is the diocese of the Episcopal Church in the United States of America (TEC) with canonical jurisdiction in the Upper Peninsula of Michigan.

History 
Initially part of the Episcopal Diocese of Michigan, it was designated a Missionary District in 1892, and became a separate diocese in 1895 as the Episcopal Diocese of Marquette. The diocese was renamed the Episcopal Diocese of Northern Michigan on June 2, 1937.

The diocese is one of the smallest, in number of congregants, in the Episcopal Church. It is headquartered in Marquette, Michigan.  there were 22 churches in the diocese.  In 2020 average Sunday attendance was 233. 

Bishop Jim Kelsey, the bishop of the diocese, died in June 2007 in a car crash. At a diocesan convention in February 2009, Kevin Thew Forrester was elected the next bishop of the diocese.  Any bishop's election requires the consent of the church's bishops along with the standing committees of the 110 dioceses and jurisdictions.  A majority of the dioceses' standing committees and a majority of the church's bishops rejected his election because of Forrester's practice of Zen Buddhist meditation, revisions that he made to the baptismal liturgy, and his beliefs about salvation.  After the deadline for consent passed, in July 2009, Presiding Bishop Katharine Jefferts Schori announced that Forrester had become the first bishop-elect in 77 years to have his election declared "null and void" by the church.  The last candidate rejected on strictly theological grounds was James DeKoven in 1875 for his high church practices.

In December 2010, a diocesan convention elected Rayford Ray as bishop. His election was confirmed by the Episcopal Church, and after his consecration in May 2011 he became the 11th diocesan bishop of the diocese.

Bishops
 1896-1919: Gershom Mott Williams (elected November 14, 1895, ordained May 1, 1896; resigned October 1919)
 1918-1929: Robert LeRoy Harris (February 1918 Coadjutor, October 1919 Bishop; resigned 1929)
 1930-1939: Hayward S. Ablewhite (elected December 1929; resigned when indicted in a defalcation and embezzlement case in October 1939, served nine months in state prison)
 1939-1942: Herman Riddle Page Sr. († April 1942)
 1942-1964: Herman Riddle Page Jr. (* May 3, 1892, † 1977)
 1964-1972: George R. Selway
 1972-1974: Samuel J. Wylie († 1974)
 1975-1981: William A. Dimmick
 1982-1999: Thomas K. Ray
 1999-2007: Jim Kelsey 2007-2011: vacant
 2011–present: Rayford Jeffrey Ray

References

External links

 

1895 establishments in Michigan
Anglican dioceses established in the 19th century
Northern Michigan, Episcopal Diocese of
 
Diocese of Northern Michigan
Province 5 of the Episcopal Church (United States)
Religious organizations established in 1895